Rosalie Anne Birch (born 6 December 1983) is an English former cricketer who played as a right-arm off break bowler and right-handed lower middle order batter. She appeared in 7 Test matches, 37 One Day Internationals and 4 Twenty20 Internationals for England between 2003 and 2008. She was part of the England team that won the Ashes in 2005 and retained them in 2008.

Domestically, Birch played for Sussex and later for Devon. She was also named in Western Storm's squad for the inaugural Women's Cricket Super League in 2016 but did not make an appearance.

From 2003, Birch combined her cricketing career with full-time study at the University of Sussex. She graduated with a BA in linguistics in 2006.

References

External links
 

1983 births
Living people
Cricketers from St Albans
Alumni of the University of Sussex
England women Test cricketers
England women One Day International cricketers
England women Twenty20 International cricketers
Sussex women cricketers
Devon women cricketers
Western Storm cricketers